The All Joseon Football Tournament was the first Korean national football competition, held annually by the Joseon Sports Council or Joseon Football Association. The tournament of the Joseon Sports Council, officially recognized as a predecessor of current Korean FA Cup, was founded in 1921 and was annually held in Gyeongseong (former Seoul) with four divisions according to age. (senior, college, middle-high school, elementary school) The Pyongyang YMCA and Kwanso Sports Council also annually held a tournament with the same name for the same period (1921–1942) in Pyongyang, but the popularly known competition is Gyeongseong's tournament.

From 1927 to 1931, the Korean college clubs participated in the senior division, because the college division was temporarily abolished during the time, and they showed overwhelming performances against senior clubs by winning all of the five editions. Since 1934, it was merged into the All Joseon Sports Festival, and was contested with other sports. However, Joseon Sports Council was forcibly disbanded by Japan in 1938, and the Sports Festival was also abolished at the time. The Joseon Football Association became the new host institution to keep the tournament, but it was finally abolished in 1940.

Senior division

List of finals

Titles by club

See also
 Football in South Korea
 List of Korean FA Cup winners
 Korean FA Cup
 Korean National Football Championship
 Kyungsung FC–Pyongyang FC rivalry

References

External links
Official website
RSSSF